Quake is the soundtrack album to the 1996 id Software video game of the same name, composed by Trent Reznor and his industrial rock band Nine Inch Nails. It was released on June 22, 1996. Originally pressed on the same disc as the game, Quake was otherwise commercially unavailable until its release on vinyl in September 2020. Reznor also provided sound effects for the game.

Recording and release
The collaboration between Nine Inch Nails and id Software occurred strictly due to a mutual admiration for each other's work; Reznor provided his services to Quake completely free of charge.

A vinyl LP edition of the soundtrack was released in 2020.

Composition and content

Aside from the first relatively driving track, Quake is a predominantly ambient soundtrack, and was Reznor's first experimentation with the genre. He would later go on to win an Academy Award for his ambient soundtrack work. The music on Quake has been described as dark, immersive, and intended to accentuate the game's oppressive tone. The music is often called "subtle", "disturbing", and "hair-raising". About the soundtrack, Reznor said, "it is not music, it's textures and ambiences and whirling machine noises and stuff. We tried to make the most sinister, depressive, scary, frightening kind of thing [...] It's been fun."

Critical reception
The Quake official soundtrack received positive reception, with many appreciating how the music builds upon the game's atmosphere. In his 1996 review of the game for GameSpot, Trent Ward wrote, "Simply put, this is the best soundtrack ever created for a computer game." Ward went on to write about how the eerie sounds and unsettling background noises heighten the game's already tense atmosphere. Major Mike of GamePro said that "With harsh, rockin' guitar riffs, and creepy low-key synthesizers, the music goes perfectly with each level and thoroughly enhances the overall atmosphere." Writing for Destructoid, Peter Glagowski said, "Not only did it show that the industry was moving beyond being targeted solely at children, but it pushed the action of its game into overdrive."

Track listing
All music written and performed by Nine Inch Nails.

CD track listing

Vinyl release track listing

Notes
 Because the soundtrack is pressed onto the same disc as the game itself, track one is relegated to game data.
 Quake's original packaging provided no official song titles. Some fans came up with unofficial titles, most of the time linking the song to the name of the level in which it first appears. The titles seen above are taken from the 2020 vinyl re-issue, in which the official titles of the songs were finally revealed.

Personnel
Credits adapted from the 2020 vinyl release.
 Trent Reznor – arranger, programming, producer
 Charlie Clouser, Robin Finck, Danny Lohner, Trent Reznor, Chris Vrenna – Nine Inch Nails (1996) 
 Tom Baker – mastering
 John Crawford – art direction
 Corey Holms – design
 John Romero – war room photos

References

1996 soundtrack albums
Nine Inch Nails soundtracks
Albums produced by Trent Reznor
Quake (series)
Trent Reznor soundtracks
Video game soundtracks